Cooling is removal of heat, usually resulting in a lower temperature and/or phase change. Temperature lowering achieved by any other means may also be called cooling. 
The transfer of thermal energy may occur via thermal radiation, heat conduction or convection. Examples can be as simple as reducing temperature of a coffee.

Devices
Coolant
Cooling towers, as used in large industrial plants and power stations
Daytime passive radiative cooler
Evaporative cooler
Heat exchanger
Heat pipe
Heat sink
HVAC (Heating, Ventilation and Air Conditioning)
Intercooler
Radiative cooling in Heat shields
Radiators in automobiles
Pumpable ice technology
Thermoelectric cooling
Vortex tube, as used in industrial spot cooling

References

External links

Heating, ventilation, and air conditioning
Broad-concept articles
Cooling technology